The Moskvitch G2 was a sports car from Moskvitch based on the earlier Moskvitch G1. It was powered by a mid-mounted   inline 4-cylinder flathead engine derived from the 407-series engine used in the 407. A  fuel tank was mounted next to the driver, toward the front of the car. The brakes, suspension, and wheels were borrowed from the Moskvitch 401.

The G2 broke several speed records in the USSR in 1956. In 1959, the engine was replaced with a unit based on the engine from the Moskvitch 407 and a rollbar was installed above the driver's seat. The G2 was decommissioned in late 1963.

Notes

Sources
Thompson, Andy. Cars of the Soviet Union. Somerset, UK: Haynes Publishing, 2008.

Sports cars
G2
Motorsport in the Soviet Union